The subtropical zones or subtropics are geographical and climate zones to the north and south of the tropics. The horse latitudes lie within this range.

Subtropical climates are often characterized by hot summers and mild winters with infrequent frost. Most subtropical climates fall into two basic types: humid subtropical (Koppen climate Cfa), where rainfall is often concentrated in the warmest months, for example Southeast China and the Southeastern United States, and dry summer or Mediterranean climate (Koppen climate Csa/Csb), where seasonal rainfall is concentrated in the cooler months, such as the Mediterranean Basin or Southern California.

Subtropical climates can also occur at high elevations within the tropics, such as in the southern end of the Mexican Plateau and in Da Lat of the Vietnamese Central Highlands. The six climate classifications use the term to help define the various temperature and precipitation regimes for planet Earth.

A great portion of the world's deserts are within the subtropics, as this is where the semi-permanent subtropical anticyclone resides (typically inland on the southwest sides of continents).  Areas bordering warm oceans (typically on the southeast sides of continents) have hot and wet summers with frequent (but brief) convective rainfall (tropical cyclones can also contribute to annual rainfall).  Areas bordering cool oceans (typically on the southwest sides of continents) are prone to fog, aridity, and dry summers. Plants such as palms, citrus, mango, pistachio, lychee, and avocado are grown in the subtropics.

Definition 

According to the American Meteorological Society, the poleward fringe of the subtropics is at latitudes approximately 35° north and south, respectively.

Several methods have been used to define the subtropical climate depending on the climate system used. 

In most regions in this climate zone the coldest month has a mean temperature of above  and the hottest month has a mean temperature of above . In the Trewartha climate classification, most of these climates are in the most equatorward portions of the temperate zone (latitudes between 23.5° and 35° north and south), aka the subtropics.

According to the Troll-Paffen climate classification, there generally exists one large subtropical zone named the warm-temperate subtropical zone, which is subdivided into seven smaller areas.

According to the E. Neef climate classification, the subtropical zone is divided into two parts: rainy winters of the west sides and eastern subtropical climate.  According to the Wilhelm Lauer & Peter Frankenberg climate classification, the subtropical zone is divided into three parts: high-continental, continental, and maritime.  According to the Siegmund/Frankenberg climate classification, subtropical is one of six climate zones in the world.

Leslie Holdridge defined the subtropical climates as having a mean annual biotemperature between the frost line or critical temperature line, 16 °C to 18 °C (depending on locations in the world), and 24 °C. The frost line separates the warm temperate region from the subtropical region. It represents the dividing line between two major physiological groups of evolved plants. Most of the plants are sensitive to low temperatures on the warmer side of the line. They can be killed back by frosts as they have not evolved to withstand periods of cold. On the colder temperate side of the line, the total flora is adapted to survive periods of variable lengths of low temperatures, whether as seeds in the case of the annuals or as perennial plants that can withstand the cold. The 16 °C–18 °C segment is often "simplified" as 17 °C .

The Holdridge subtropical climates straddle more or less the warmest subtropical climates and the less warm tropical climates as defined by the Köppen-Geiger or Trewartha climate classifications.

This definition, though restricted to dry regions, is almost similar to Holdridge's.

Rainfall 

Heating of the earth by the sun near the equator leads to large amounts of upward motion and convection winds along the monsoon trough or intertropical convergence zone. The upper-level divergence over the near-equatorial trough leads to air rising and moving away from the equator aloft.  As the air moves towards the mid-latitudes, it cools, gets denser and sinks, which leads to subsidence near the 30th parallel of both hemispheres. This circulation is known as the Hadley cell and leads to the formation of the subtropical ridge. Many of the world's deserts are caused by these climatological high-pressure areas, within the subtropics. This regime is known as a semiarid/arid subtropical climate, which is generally in areas adjacent to powerful cold ocean currents. Examples of this climate are the coastal areas of Southern Africa and the west coast of South America.

The humid subtropical climate is often on the western side of the subtropical high. Here, unstable tropical airmasses in summer bring convective overturning and frequent tropical downpours, and summer is normally the season of peak annual rainfall. In the winter (dry season) the monsoon retreats, and the drier trade winds bring more stable airmass and often dry weather, and frequent sunny skies. Areas that have this type of subtropical climate include Australia, Southeast Asia, and parts of South America. In areas bounded by warm ocean like the southeastern United States and East Asia, tropical cyclones can contribute significantly to local rainfall within the subtropics.  Japan receives over half of its rainfall from typhoons.

The Mediterranean climate is a subtropical climate with a wet season in winter and a dry season in the summer. Regions with this type of climate include the rim lands of the Mediterranean Sea, southwestern Australia, parts of the west coast of South America around Santiago, the coastal areas of the lower west coast of the United States.

Flora 

These climates do not routinely see hard freezes or snow due to winter on average being above freezing, which allows plants such as palms and citrus to flourish. As one moves toward the tropical side the slight winter cool season disappears, while at the poleward threshold of the subtropics the winters become cooler. Some crops which have been traditionally farmed in tropical climates, such as mango, litchi, and avocado, are also cultivated in the subtropics.  Pest control of the crops is easier than in the tropics, due to the cooler winters.

Tree ferns (pteridophytes) are grown in subtropical areas, as are dracaena and yucca, and trees in the Taxaceae. Apple, pear and pomegranate also grow well in the subtropics.

Varieties

Humid subtropical climate

The humid subtropical climate is a subtropical climate type characterized by hot, humid summers and generally mild winters. This climate can be found in Northern Vietnam (including Hanoi), eastern Australia, southern and southeast China, southern Japan, the deep southeastern United States, and southeast South America area.  

In most humid subtropical climates, summer is the wettest season. In summer, the subtropical high pressure cells provide a sultry southernly flow of tropical air with high dew points, and frequent (but brief) convective showers are common. With decreasing latitude most humid subtropical climates typically have drier winters and wetter summers, however some sectors with this climate see a more even rhythm of seasonal rainfall.  Tropical lows and weakening tropical storms often contribute to seasonal rainfall in most humid subtropical climates. In the cool season (winter) the subtropical highs retreat, and the humid subtropics are more influenced by the westerlies and the fronts and storms that move with them.

Mediterranean climate

The Mediterranean climate regime resembles the climate of the lands in the Mediterranean Basin, parts of lower West Coast of the United States, parts of Western and South Australia, in southwestern South Africa and in parts of central Chile. The climate is characterized by hot dry summers and cooler winters with rainfall. In Europe, the northernmost mediterranean climates are found along the Italian Riviera, at 44° latitude. Parts of southwestern Australia around Perth have a Mediterranean climate as do areas around coastal South Africa.

Semi-desert/desert climate

According to Köppen, arid subtropical climates are characterized by an annual average temperature above , the absence of regular rainfall, and high humidity.

See also

Geographical zone
Subtropical cyclone
35th parallel north
35th parallel south
Tropic of Cancer
Tropic of Capricorn

References

Physical geography
Climate zones